Simonton may refer to:

Places
 Simonton, Texas, city in Fort Bend County, Texas
 Simonton Lake, Indiana, census-designated place in Elkhart County, Indiana
People
 Ann Simonton, writer, lecturer and feminist media activist
 Ashbel Green Simonton, (1833-1867), American Presbyterian minister and missionary
 Charles Bryson Simonton (1838-1911), member of the United States House of Representatives
 Charles Henry Simonton (1829–1904), United States federal judge
 John Simonton (1943–2005), circuit designer
 Ken Simonton (1979-), American football running back
 O. Carl Simonton, American psycho-oncologist
 Richard Simonton (1915-1979), also known as Doug Malloy,  Hollywood businessman and entrepreneur
 William Simonton (1788-1846), Whig member of the U.S. House of Representatives from Pennsylvania
Companies
 Simonton Windows & Doors, window and door manufacturer